Terry Alan Schroeder, DC (born October 9, 1958) is an American former water polo player who competed in the 1984 Summer Olympics, in the 1988 Summer Olympics, and in the 1992 Summer Olympics. Schroeder is a chiropractor, practicing in Agoura Hills, California. He is a 1986 graduate of Palmer Chiropractic College – West where he met his wife, Lori Schroeder. They have two daughters. He is currently the head water polo coach at Pepperdine University, and has been since 2013. He also coached at Pepperdine from 1986–2005, but left to become the head coach for the United States Olympic team before returning to Pepperdine.

Schroeder won two consecutive silver medals at the 1984 and 1988 Olympics. He was given the honor to carry the national flag of the United States at the closing ceremony of the 1988 Summer Olympics in Seoul, becoming the 16th water polo player to be a flag bearer at the opening and closing ceremonies of the Olympics. Twenty years later, he coached the United States men's national team to a silver in 2008, becoming one of a few sportspeople who won Olympic medals in water polo as players and head coaches.

In 1999, Schroeder was inducted into the USA Water Polo Hall of Fame. In 2002, he was inducted into the International Swimming Hall of Fame.

A headless bronze statue of a nude Schroeder stands atop a 20,000-pound (9,000 kg) post-and-lintel frame in front of the Los Angeles Memorial Coliseum, created by Robert Graham  for the 1984 Summer Olympics. On the same frame, to the south of Schroeder's statue, is a statue of Jennifer Innis, a long jumper from Guyana.

See also
 List of Olympic medalists in water polo (men)
 List of members of the International Swimming Hall of Fame

References

External links
 

1958 births
Living people
Sportspeople from Santa Barbara, California
American male water polo players
Water polo players at the 1984 Summer Olympics
Water polo players at the 1988 Summer Olympics
Water polo players at the 1992 Summer Olympics
Medalists at the 1984 Summer Olympics
Medalists at the 1988 Summer Olympics
Olympic silver medalists for the United States in water polo
American water polo coaches
United States men's national water polo team coaches
Water polo coaches at the 2008 Summer Olympics
Water polo coaches at the 2012 Summer Olympics
American chiropractors